Dipankar Banerjee may refer to:

Dipankar Banerjee (army general), Indian army general
Dipankar Banerjee (metallurgist), Indian metallurgist

See also
Dibakar Banerjee, Indian filmmaker